Selvaggio is a surname. Notable people with the surname include:

 Antonio Selvaggio (born 1958), Italian long-distance runner
 Giulio Lorenzo Selvaggio (1728–1772), Italian canonist and archaeologist
 Piero Selvaggio (born 1958), Italian long-distance runner

It may also refer to;
 Il Selvaggio, discontinued Italian magazine (1924–1943)

Italian-language surnames